Muyuan Foodstuff is a Chinese food company specializing in pork production. As of 2019, Muyuan slaughters approximately five million pigs per year. They operate the world's largest pig farm.

History 
Muyuan was founded by husband and wife Qin Yinglin and Qian Ying, who started their first farm in 1992. The operation grew rapidly. By 1994 they had 2,000 pigs, and by 1997 they had 10,000. In 2000 Qin founded Muyuan Farming (牧原养殖), the company that would eventually become Muyuan Foodstuff. In 2010, the company received an International Finance Corporation loan and investment. By 2013, Muyuan Foodstuff Ltd. had two wholly owned subsidiaries and one participating company, and was raising more than one million pigs for slaughter per year. On 28 January 2014, Muyuan stock (002714.SZ) started trading on the Shenzhen Stock Exchange. By 2019 they were the second largest pork producer in China after Wens Foodstuff Group.

In 2020 the African swine fever epidemic caused the global price of pork to rise and Muyuan's profits grew 1,413% in the first nine months of 2020. This cash allowed them to invest in a new generation of mega farms. During the swine fever crisis, Muyuan was able to thrive because it owns more of its own facilities than competitors, allowing it to better control the spread of disease.

In 2021 they were the world's leading sow producer.

Facilities 
Muyuan's pig farm near Nanyang is the world's largest. Its pig barns are multistory which allows for higher density. The farm is farrow-to-finish meaning that pigs taken from breeding to slaughter on-site. Production at this farm is targeted at 2.1 million pigs a year.

References

External links 
 

Pig farming
Chinese companies established in 1992
Food and drink companies of China
Meat companies